Azel is the third studio album by Nigerien musician Bombino. It was released on April 1, 2016 under Partisan Records.

Track listing

References

2016 albums
Albums produced by David Longstreth
Desert blues albums